The 1980 Los Angeles County Board of Supervisors election was held on November 4, 1980, coinciding with the 1980 United States presidential election. Two of the five seats (for the Fourth and Fifth Districts) of the Los Angeles County Board of Supervisors was contested in this election.

Results

Fourth District

Fifth District

References

External links 
 Los Angeles County Department of Registrar-Recorder/County Clerk

Los Angeles County Board of Supervisors
Los Angeles County Board of Supervisors elections
Los Angeles County